Gibberula differens is a species of sea snail, a marine gastropod mollusk, in the family Cystiscidae.

References

differens
Gastropods described in 1904
Cystiscidae